Delfina Cassinda (born 6 January 1980) is an Angolan middle-distance runner. She competed in the women's 800 metres at the 2000 Summer Olympics.

References

External links
 

1980 births
Living people
Athletes (track and field) at the 2000 Summer Olympics
Angolan female middle-distance runners
Olympic athletes of Angola
Place of birth missing (living people)